Paul Armont (1874–1943) was a Russian-born French playwright and screenwriter. He also collaborated with the Swiss writer Marcel Gerbidon. He was born Dimitri Petrococchino in Rostov in the Russian Empire.

Selected plays
 1913 – Le Chevalier au masque, co-written by Jean Manoussi
 1920 – La Maison du passeur, episode of World War I, co-written by Louis Verneuil
 1934 – Le Coup du parapluie
 1939 – Garçons, filles et chiens (Face to the Wind), co-written by Paul Vandenberghe

In collaboration with Nicolas Nancey
 1905 – Le Truc du Brésilien
 1906 – Le Trèfle à quatre
 1909 – Théodore et Cie
 1920 – Le Zèbre

In collaboration with Marcel Gerbidon
 1914 – La Tontine
 1916 – Le Coq en pâte
 1916 – Le Mari garçon
 1918 – School for Coquettes, Théâtre du Grand-Guignol
 1923 – Dicky, co-written with Jean Manoussi
 1924 – Un chien qui rapporte
 1925 – Alain, sa mère et sa maîtresse
 1925 – Jeunes filles de palaces
 1927 – Le Club des loufoques
 1927 – L'Enlèvement, Théâtre de la Michodière, 6 September
 1928 – Souris d'hôtel
 1929 – L'Enlèvement
 1929 – L'Amoureuse Aventure
 1930 – Coiffeur pour dames
 1930 – Fleurs de luxe, Théâtre Daunou
 1933 – Un soir de réveillon (operetta), lyrics Jean Boyer, music Raoul Moretti

In collaboration with Jacques Bousquet
 1921 – Comédienne
 1925 – Le Danseur de Madame

In collaboration with Léopold Marchand
 1923 – La Femme du jour, Théâtre de la Potinière
 1924 – Le Tailleur au château
 1931 – Ces messieurs de la Santé
 1938 – Le Valet maître, Théâtre de la Michodière

Filmography
, directed by Filippo Castamagna (Italy, 1916, based on the play Le Truc du Brésilien)
The Glad Eye, directed by Kenelm Foss and James Reardon (UK, 1920, based on the play Le Zèbre)
The Hotel Mouse, directed by Fred Paul (UK, 1923, based on the play Souris d'hôtel) 
The French Doll, directed by Robert Z. Leonard (1923, based on the play Jeunes filles de palaces)
The Goldfish, directed by Jerome Storm (1924, based on the play School for Coquettes)
Teodoro e socio, directed by Mario Bonnard (Italy, 1925, based on the play Théodore et Cie) 
Dancing Mad, directed by Alexander Korda (Germany, 1925, based on the play Le Danseur de Madame) 
Fashions for Women, directed by Dorothy Arzner (1927, based on the play La Femme du jour) 
The Glad Eye, directed by Maurice Elvey (UK, 1927, based on the play Le Zèbre) 
Souris d'hôtel, directed by Adelqui Migliar (France, 1929, based on the play Souris d'hôtel) 
Madame Makes Her Exit, directed by Wilhelm Thiele (German, 1931, based on the play L'Amoureuse Aventure) 
**Amourous Adventure, directed by Wilhelm Thiele (French, 1932, based on the play L'Amoureuse Aventure) 
, directed by Jean Choux (France, 1932, based on the play Un chien qui rapporte)
Coiffeur pour dames, directed by René Guissart (France, 1932, based on the play Coiffeur pour dames)
Love Me Tonight, directed by Rouben Mamoulian (1932, based on the play Le Tailleur au château)
Le Truc du Brésilien, directed by Alberto Cavalcanti (France, 1932, based on the play Le Truc du Brésilien)
, directed by Pierre Colombier (France, 1933, based on the play Théodore et Cie)
Le Mari garçon, directed by Alberto Cavalcanti (France, 1933, based on the play Le Mari garçon)
, directed by Karl Anton (France, 1933, based on the operetta Un soir de réveillon)
, directed by Pierre Colombier (France, 1934, based on the play Ces messieurs de la Santé)
School for Coquettes, directed by Pierre Colombier (France, 1935, based on the play School for Coquettes)
, directed by Géza von Bolváry (Germany, 1936, based on the play L'Enlèvement)
The Mysterious Mister X, directed by J. A. Hübler-Kahla (Germany, 1936, based on the play Dicky)
, directed by Robert Péguy (France, 1938, based on the play Dicky)
Un mare di guai, directed by Carlo Ludovico Bragaglia (Italy, 1939, based on the play Théodore et Cie)
, directed by Raffaello Matarazzo (Italy, 1940, based on the play Dicky)
, directed by Paul Mesnier (France, 1941, based on the play Le Valet maître)
, directed by Robert Vernay (France, 1950, based on the play Garçons, filles et chiens)
Un amour de parapluie, directed by Jean Laviron (France, 1951, short film based on the play Le Coup du parapluie)
An Artist with Ladies, directed by Jean Boyer (France, 1952, based on the play Coiffeur pour dames)
The Purple Mask, directed by H. Bruce Humberstone (1955, based on the play Le Chevalier au masque)
School for Coquettes, directed by Jacqueline Audry (France, 1958, based on the play School for Coquettes)

External links
 

1874 births
1943 deaths
People from Rostov
French male screenwriters
20th-century French screenwriters
20th-century French dramatists and playwrights
French male dramatists and playwrights
Russian screenwriters
Russian dramatists and playwrights
20th-century French male writers
20th-century Russian writers
French people of Russian descent
Emigrants from the Russian Empire to France
Russian male dramatists and playwrights